Sir William Edmund Garstin, GCMG, GBE (29 January 1849 – 8 January 1925) was a British civil engineer. He was responsible for a number of important hydrological and public works in Egypt.

Garstin was Under Secretary of State for Public Works in Egypt. He held this position during the construction of the Aswan Low Dam across the Nile 1898–1902. For his services to this project he was appointed a Knight Grand Cross of the Order of St Michael and St George (GCMG) in December 1902. In early 1903 Garstein and a surveyor travelled the Lake Edward, the Semliki River and the Lake Albert, and visited Mombasa, Uganda, Gondokoro and Khartoum.

After his death Garstin was cremated at Golders Green Crematorium.

The extinct giant snake Gigantophis garstini was named in his honour.

References 
 

1849 births
1925 deaths
British civil engineers
British expatriates in Egypt
Knights Grand Cross of the Order of St Michael and St George
Knights Grand Cross of the Order of the British Empire